Norman Taylor may refer to:

Norman Taylor (rower) (1899–1980), Canadian
Norman Taylor (scientist) (1900–1975), New Zealand
Norman Taylor (basketball) (1965–2020), American basketball player